Firewall is a crime novel by Swedish author Henning Mankell.

Synopsis
A series of bizarre incidents sweep across Sweden: a man dies in front of an ATM, two young women slaughter an elderly taxi driver, a murder is committed aboard a Baltic Sea ferry, and a sub-station engineer makes a gruesome discovery while investigating the cause of a nationwide power cut. As Wallander investigates, he uncovers a sinister plan to bring the Western world to its knees.

Theme

The major background theme around which the action takes place is the dilemma of the Western economic system versus poverty. The criminal mastermind is a persuasive and talented IT specialist who plans to right the wrongs of the world by deleting vast quantities of money from multinational banks' accounts system, so bringing on a credit and financial panic.

The criminals believe their intended cybercrime is justified; for them the big picture involves the sacrifice of the banking system in order to wipe out third world debt. At a crucial moment Wallander unwittingly manages to persuade a key accomplice that, ethically, there is in fact no big picture, that instead we just have lives that are fragile but also miraculous.

Adaptations 
In 2006, Swedish production company Tre Vänner Produktion produced a four-part television miniseries adaptation of Firewall, starring Rolf Lassgård as Wallander. In 2008, British broadcaster BBC One broadcast a 90-minute adaptation as part of its Wallander television series starring Kenneth Branagh.

1998 Swedish novels
Novels by Henning Mankell
Wallander
Novels set in Sweden
Ordfront books